Johann Mair was an Italian luger who competed in the mid-1970s. A natural track luger, he and Michael Plaikner won a silver medal in the men's doubles event at the 1977 FIL European Luge Natural Track Championships in Seis am Schlern, Italy.

References
Natural track European Championships results 1970-2010.

Italian male lugers
Italian lugers
Year of birth missing
Possibly living people
Sportspeople from Südtirol